TED Conferences, LLC (Technology, Entertainment, Design) is an American-Canadian non-profit media organization that posts international talks online for free distribution under the slogan "ideas worth spreading". TED was founded by Richard Saul Wurman and Harry Marks in February 1984 as a tech conference, in which  gave a demo of the compact disc that was invented in October 1982. It has been held annually since 1990. TED covers almost all topics – from science to business to global issues – in more than 100 languages. To date, more than 13,000 TEDx events have been held in at least 150 countries.

TED's early emphasis was on technology and design, consistent with its Silicon Valley origins. It has since broadened its perspective to include talks on many scientific, cultural, political, humanitarian, and academic topics. It has been curated by Chris Anderson, a British-American businessman, through the non-profit TED Foundation since July 2019 (originally by the non-profit Sapling Foundation).

The main TED conference is held annually in Vancouver, British Columbia, Canada, at the Vancouver Convention Centre. The first TED conferences from 1984 (TED1) through 2008 (TED2008) were held at the Monterey Conference Center in Monterey, California. Between 2009 and 2014, the conference was held in Long Beach, California, United States. TED events are also held throughout North America and in Europe, Asia, and Africa, offering live streaming of the talks. TED returned to Monterey, California, in 2021 with TEDMonterey. They address a wide range of topics within the research and practice of science and culture, often through storytelling.

Since June 2006, TED Talks have been offered for free viewing online, under an Attribution-NonCommercial-NoDerivatives Creative Commons license, through TED.com.  over 3,500 TED Talks are freely available on the official website. In June 2011, TED Talks' combined viewing figures surpassed 500 million, and by November 2012, TED Talks had been watched over one billion times worldwide. While TED Talks are available for free online to be viewed by anyone, sharing TED content in commercial contexts (for example, in corporate learning and talent development) requires a license.

History

1984–1999: Founding and early years

TED was conceived in 1984 by Emmy-winning broadcast and graphic designer Harry Marks, who observed convergence of the fields of technology, entertainment, and design (that is, "TED"). He approached for assistance an architect and graphic designer Richard Saul Wurman. Wurman agreed on condition that he would be a co-founder. The first conference, organized by Marks and Wurman with help from Dr Frank Stanton, featured demos of the compact disc, co-developed by Philips and Sony and one of the first demonstrations of the Apple Macintosh computer. Presentations were given by the mathematician Benoit Mandelbrot and others such as Nicholas Negroponte and Stewart Brand. The event was financially unsuccessful; six years elapsed before a second conference was organised.

TED2 was held at the same Monterey Conference Center in California in 1990. From 1990 onward, a growing community of "TEDsters" gathered annually with Wurman leading the conference in Monterey until 2009, when it was relocated to Long Beach, California, due to a substantial increase in the number of those  attending. Initially, the speakers had been drawn from the fields of expertise behind the acronym TED, but during the 1990s, the roster of presenters broadened to include scientists, philosophers, musicians, religious leaders, philanthropists, and many others.

2000–present: Recent growth
In 2000, Wurman, looking for a successor at age 65, met with new-media entrepreneur and TED enthusiast Chris Anderson to discuss future happenings. Anderson's UK media company Future bought TED. In November 2001, Anderson's non-profit The Sapling Foundation (motto: "fostering the spread of great ideas") acquired TED from Future for £6m. In February 2002, Anderson gave a TED Talk in which he explained his vision of the conference and his future role of curator. Wurman left after the 2002 conference.

In 2006, attendance cost was $4,400 per person and was by invitation only. The membership model was shifted in January 2007 to an annual membership fee of $6,000, which includes attendance of the conference, club mailings, networking tools, and conference DVDs. The 2018 conference was $10,000 per attendee.

Between 2001 and 2006, TED upgraded its platform to have TED talks online for free, added TEDGlobal that became a worldwide conference, and created the TED prize.

In 2014, the conference was relocated to Vancouver, British Columbia, Canada.

TED is currently funded by a combination of various revenue streams, including conference attendance fees, corporate sponsorships, foundation support, licensing fees, and book sales. Corporate sponsorships are diverse, provided by companies such as Google, GE, AOL, Goldman Sachs, and The Coca-Cola Company. Sponsors do not participate in the creative direction of the event, nor are they allowed to present on the main stage, in the interests of independence.

In 2015, TED staff consisted of about 180 people headquartered in New York City and Vancouver, British Columbia. On July 1, 2019, the TED Conferences LLC was transferred from Sapling Foundation to TED Foundation to "align with our brand and make it easier for our donors to connect TED donations to TED Conferences, LLC."

At TED 2015, Bill Gates warned that the world was not prepared for the next pandemic, a situation that would come to pass in late 2019 when the COVID-19 pandemic began.

In 2021, TED launched the TED Audio Collective with a number of podcasts featuring previous TED Talks and other relevant topics.

TED 2022 was held in Vancouver. There was criticism after Marvin Rees, Mayor of Bristol, flew  to speak about climate change and the need for reduced carbon emissions.

In 2023 The Wallet Group launched the TED Talks Digital Card, containing information and updates about TED. The Card acts as a Pass in an individual's smartphone wallet, and is free for all users.

TED Prize
The TED Prize was introduced in 2005. Until 2010, it annually granted three individuals $100,000 and a "wish to change the world". Each winner unveils their wish at the main annual conference. Since 2010, in a changed selection process, a single winner is chosen to ensure that TED can maximize its efforts in achieving the winner's wish. In 2012, the prize was not awarded to an individual, but to a concept connected to the current global phenomenon of increasing urbanization. In 2013, the prize amount was increased to $1 million. TED Prize winners in previous years:

TED Conference commissioned New York artist Tom Shannon to create a prize sculpture to be given to all TED Prize winners. The sculpture consists of an  aluminum sphere magnetically levitated above a walnut disc. As of 2018 the TED Prize has been recast as The Audacious Project.

TED.com
In 2005, Chris Anderson hired June Cohen as Director of TED Media. In June 2006, after Cohen's idea of a TV show based on TED lectures was rejected by several networks, a selection of talks that had received the highest audience ratings was posted on the websites of TED, YouTube, and iTunes, under Creative Commons Attribution-NonCommercial-NoDerivs 3.0. Initially, only a handful of talks were posted, to test if there was an audience for them. In January of the next year, the number of TED Talks on the site had grown to 44, and they had been viewed more than three million times. On the basis of that success, the organization pumped hundreds of thousands of dollars into its video production operations and into the development of a website to showcase about 100 of the talks.

In April 2007, the new TED.com was launched, developed by New York and San Francisco-based design company Method. In subsequent years, the website has won many prizes, among which are seven Webby Awards, iTunes' "Best Podcast of the Year" (2006–2010), the Communication Arts Interactive Award for "Information Design" in 2007, the OMMA Award for "video sharing" in 2008, the Web Visionary Award for "technical achievement" in 2008, The One Show Interactive Bronze Award in 2008, the AIGA Annual Design Competition (2009), and a Peabody Award in 2012.

In January 2009, the then number of videos had been viewed 50 million times. In June 2011, the number of views totaled 500 million, and on November 13, 2012, TED reached its billionth video view. in In March 2012, Chris Anderson said in an interview:

In March 2012, Netflix announced a deal to stream an initial series of 16 two-hour shows, consisting of TED Talks covering similar subjects, from multiple speakers. The content was made available to subscribers in the US, Canada, Latin America, the UK, and Ireland. Hosted by Jami Floyd, TED Talks NYC debuted on NYC Life on March 21, 2012.

As of October 2020, over 3500 TED talks had been posted. Every week, five to seven new talks are published. For most talks published on TED.com, introduction of the talk and speaker, and a transcript are provided; and for some videos, footnotes and resource list are also available.

Related projects and events

TED conferences

TEDGlobal
In 2005, under Anderson's supervision, a more internationally oriented sister conference was added, under the name TEDGlobal. It was held, in chronological order: in Oxford, UK (2005), in Arusha, Tanzania (2007, titled TEDAfrica), in Oxford again (2009 and 2010), and in Edinburgh, UK (2011, 2012, and 2013). In 2014, it was held in Rio de Janeiro, Brazil. Additionally, there was TED India, in Mysore (2009) and TEDGlobal London in London (2015). TEDGlobal 2017 was held again in Arusha, Tanzania, and it was curated and hosted by Emeka Okafor.

TED's European director (and curator of TEDGlobal) is Swiss-born Bruno Giussani.

The TED 2011 conference, The Rediscovery of Wonder, was held in Long Beach, California, US, from February 28 to March 4, 2011. The TED conference has a companion conference, TEDGlobal, held in the UK each summer. The 2009 TEDGlobal, The Substance of Things Not Seen, was held in Oxford, July 21–24, 2009. 2010's TEDGlobal (again in Oxford) was themed And Now The Good News; in 2011 the conference moved to a new home in Edinburgh and was held July 12–15 with the theme The Stuff Of Life. The 2012 TEDGlobal conference Radical Openness was held in Edinburgh, June 25–29.

TED Translators
TED Translators, formerly known as the Open Translation Project (OTP), started as the TED Open Translation Project in May 2009. It intends to "[reach] out to the 4.5 billion people on the planet who don't speak English", according to TED Curator Chris Anderson. The OTP used crowd-based subtitling platforms to translate the text of TED and TED-Ed videos, as well as to caption and translate videos created in the TEDx program. (Until May 2012 it worked with its technology partner dotSUB, and then with the open source translation tool Amara). When the project was launched, 300 translations had been completed in 40 languages by 200 volunteer transcribers. By May 2015, more than 70,000 sets of subtitles in 107 languages had been completed by (an all-time total of) 38,173 volunteer translators.

The project helped generate a significant increase in international visitors to TED's website. Traffic from outside the US has increased 350 percent: there has been 600 percent growth in Asia, and more than 1000 percent in South America.
Members have several tools dedicated to knowledge management, such as the OTP Wiki OTPedia, Facebook groups, or video tutorials.

TEDx
TEDx are independent events similar to TED in presentation. They can be organized by anyone who obtains a free license from TED, and agrees to follow certain principles. TEDx events are required to be non-profit, but organizers may use an admission fee or commercial sponsorship to cover costs. Speakers are not paid and must also relinquish the copyrights to their materials, which TED may edit and distribute under a Creative Commons license.

As of January 2014, the TEDxTalks library contained some 30,000 films and presentations from more than 130 countries. As of October 2017, the TEDx archive surpassed 100,000 talks. In March 2013, eight TEDx events were organised every day; raised up from five in June 2012, the previous year, in 133 countries. TEDx presentations may include live performances, which are catalogued in the TEDx Music Project.

In 2011, TED began a program called "TEDx in a Box", which is intended to enable people in developing countries to hold TEDx events. TEDx also expanded to include TEDxYouth events, TEDx corporate events, and TEDxWomen. TEDxYouth events are independent programs set up for students who are in grades 7–12. These events usually have audiences of people close to the age of the students and sometimes show TED Talks. According to TEDxSanta Cruz, "as of 2015, over 1,500 [TEDx events] have been scheduled all over the world."

TEDx events have evolved over time. Events such as TEDxBeaconStreet created TEDx Adventures for participants. People may sign up for free, hands-on experiences in their local communities, led by an expert.

A TEDx youth event license follows the same format as the standard event license and falls within the same TEDx event rules, except this event is oriented towards youth. TEDxYouth licenses may be held by youth, adults, or a combination of both. For events held at schools, the license must be held by a current student, faculty, or staff member. The first TEDxYouth event was held by TEDxYouth@Tokyo in Japan.

TED Fellows

TED Fellows were introduced in 2007, during the first TEDAfrica conference in Arusha, Tanzania, where 100 young people were selected from across the continent. Two years later, during TEDIndia, 99 Fellows were recruited, mainly from South Asia.

In 2009, the Fellows program was initiated in its present form. For every TED or TEDGlobal conference, 20 Fellows are selected; a total of 40 new Fellows a year. Each year, 20 past Fellows are chosen to participate in the two-year Senior Fellows program (in which they will attend four more conferences).

2019 marked the tenth anniversary of the TED Fellows program.

Acceptance as a Fellow is not based on academic credentials, but mainly on past and current actions, and plans for the future. Besides attending a conference free of charge, each Fellow takes part in a special program with mentoring by experts in the field of spreading ideas, and he or she can give a short talk on the "TED Fellows" stage. Some of these talks are subsequently published on TED.com. Senior Fellows have additional benefits and responsibilities.

TED-Ed
TED-Ed is a YouTube channel from Ted which creates short animated educational videos. It also has its own website. TED-Ed lessons are created in collaboration with educators and animators. Current advisers for Ted-Ed lessons include Aaron Sams, Jackie Bezos, John Hunter, Jonathan Bergmann, Melinda French Gates, and Sal Khan. It has over 17.8 million subscribers and over 3.3 billion views as of November 2022.

TED Audio Collective
The TED Audio Collective is a collection of podcasts for the curious with over 25 shows. 

One of those shows is the TED Interview podcast which launched on October 16, 2018, during which Chris Anderson holds conversations with speakers who have previously given a TED talk, providing the guest a chance to speak in greater depth about their background, projects, motivation, re-evaluation of past experiences, or plans for the future.

Each interview lasts between 45 minutes and about one hour. All podcasts are available on the TED website, in part together with transcripts, as well as through platforms such as Apple Podcasts, Spotify, Google Podcasts, TuneIn, Stitcher, RadioPublic, Castbox, iHeartRadio, and BBC Radio 4 Extra.

Season Four began in March 2020 during the COVID-19 pandemic as a live-stream broadcast co-hosted by Chris Anderson and Whitney Pennington Rodgers and often offered listeners the opportunity to submit questions to the speaker.

TEDMED

TEDMED is an annual conference concerned with health and medicine. It is an independent event operating under license from the nonprofit TED conference.

TEDMED was founded in 1998 by TED's founder Ricky Wurman. After years of inactivity, in 2008 Wurman sold TEDMED to entrepreneur Marc Hodosh, who recreated and relaunched it. The first event under Hodosh's ownership was held in San Diego in October 2009. In January 2010, TED.com began including videos of TEDMED talks on the TED website.

The second Hodosh-owned edition of TEDMED took place in October 2010, also in San Diego. It sold out for a second year and attracted notable healthcare leaders and Hollywood celebrities.

In 2011, Jay Walker and a group of executives and investors purchased TEDMED from Hodosh for $16 million with future additional payments of as much as $9 million. The conference was then moved to Washington, DC.

TEDWomen 
TEDWomen is an annual three-day conference. Established in 2010, TEDWomen features speakers focused on women-oriented themes, including gender issues and reproductive health. There are over 130 TEDWomen Talks available to watch on the TED website. Past speakers include former president Jimmy Carter, Hillary Clinton, Sheryl Sandberg, Madeleine Albright, Nancy Pelosi and Halla Tómasdóttir.

TEDYouth 
TEDYouth talks are aimed at middle school and high school students and feature information from youth innovators.

Other programs

 TED@Work — A program that leverages TED content to inspire new ways of working in professional settings. This program provides ways for organizations and companies to license TED content for use in learning and talent development contexts.
TED Books — These are original books from TED. The initiative began in January 2011 as an ebook series and re-launched in September 2014 with its first book in print.
 TedEd Clubs — An education based initiative to get young people (ages 8 to 18) to share their ideas with peers and others by giving a TED-like presentation on a topic. TED provides curricula and limited support for the Clubs free of charge.
 TED Salon — Smaller evening-length events with speakers and performers.
 TED Radio Hour — A radio program, with audio downloads and a podcast RSS feed, hosted by Manoush Zomorodi, previously Guy Raz and co-produced with NPR. Each episode uses multiple TED Talks to examine a common theme. The first episode was broadcast in 2012.
TEDx Talks is a YouTube channel which is ranked No. 1 globally for a non profit (2021). The channel has approximately 30m subscribers and 800m views with estimated revenues of between $24.5K – $391.6K monthly.
TED Countdown is a global initiative, powered by TED and Future Stewards, to accelerate solutions to the climate crisis. The goal: to build a better future by cutting greenhouse gas emissions in half by 2030 towards reaching net zero by 2050. Launched 2020 online, summit 2021 in Edinburgh, Scotland.
TED also offers other podcasts such as Sincerely, X (featuring anonymous TED Talks) and Work / Life which discusses creative workplaces.

Criticism

Pricing
Frank Swain, a journalist, refused to participate in a TEDx event without getting paid. He said that it is unacceptable that TED, which is a non-profit organization, charges TED attendees $6,000 but prohibits organisers of the smaller, independently organized TEDx events from paying anything to speakers. Speakers and performers at official TED events are not compensated for their talks.

Sarah Lacy of BusinessWeek and TechCrunch wrote in 2010 that TED attendees complained of elitism from a "hierarchy of parties throughout the LA-area with strict lists and security" after the sessions. She gave TED credit for making talks free online or live streamed.

TED Talk content
Disagreements have also occurred between TED speakers and organizers. In her 2010 TED Talk, comedian Sarah Silverman referred to adopting a "retarded" child. TED organizer Chris Anderson objected via his Twitter account, leading to a Twitter skirmish between them.

Also in 2010, statistician Nassim Taleb called TED a "monstrosity that turns scientists and thinkers into low-level entertainers, like circus performers". He claimed TED curators did not initially post his talk "warning about the financial crisis" on their site on purely cosmetic grounds.

In May 2012, venture capitalist Nick Hanauer spoke at TED University, challenging the belief that top income earners in America are the engines of job creation. TED attracted controversy when it chose not to post Hanauer's talk on their website. His talk analysed the top rate of tax versus unemployment and economic equality. TED was accused of censoring the talk by not posting it on the website.

On May 7, 2012, Chris Anderson, the curator of TED, in an email to Hanauer, commented on his decision and took issue with several of Hanauer's assertions in the talk, including the idea that businesspeople are not job creators. He also made clear his aversion to the "political" nature of the talk.
 The National Journal reported that Chris Anderson had reacted by saying the talk probably ranked as one of the most politically controversial talks they had ever run, and they needed to be careful about when they posted it. Anderson officially responded on his personal blog, stating that TED only posts one talk every day, selected from many. Forbes staff writer Bruce Upbin described Hanauer's talk as "shoddy and dumb" while New York magazine condemned TED's move.

Following a TEDx talk by parapsychologist Rupert Sheldrake, TED issued a statement saying their scientific advisors believed that "there is little evidence for some of Sheldrake's more radical claims" made in the talk and recommended that it "should not be distributed without being framed with caution". The video of the talk was moved from the TEDx YouTube channel to the TED blog accompanied by the framing language called for by the advisors. The move and framing prompted accusations of censorship, to which TED responded by saying the accusations were "simply not true" since Sheldrake's talk was still on their website. A 2013 talk by Graham Hancock, promoting the use of the drug DMT, was treated in the same way.

According to professor Benjamin Bratton at University of California, San Diego, TED Talks' efforts at fostering progress in socio-economics, science, philosophy, and technology have been ineffective. Chris Anderson responded that some critics have a misconception of TED's goals, and failed to recognise that TED aimed to instill excitement in the audience in the same way the speaker felt it. He stated that TED only wishes to bring news of the significance of certain topics to a large audience.

In popular culture
The Alien franchise features a fictional portrayal of the year 2023 edition of the TED Conference in the form of a short film called "The Peter Weyland Files: TED Conference, 2023". This was a part of the viral marketing campaign for the Prometheus film.

See also

 List of educational video websites
 List of TED speakers
 Chautauqua

References

External links

1984 establishments in the United States
Academic conferences
American educational websites
Business conferences
Education-related YouTube channels
International conferences
Non-profit organizations based in New York City
Organizations established in 1984
Peabody Award-winning websites
Recurring events established in 1984
Technology conferences
 
Universal Windows Platform apps
YouTube channels
Public speaking